Dr. Christoph Staewen (14 July 1926 – 24 April 2002) was a German medical doctor, specialist of psychiatry, neurology and psychotherapy. In 1963 and early 1964 he visited parts of west and central Africa, amongst others the Tibesti region. In 1964, amongst the people of Yoruba, he began to study in Western Nigeria the conditions of uprooting of these people caused by the increasing confrontation with the technical civilisation of the "First World", and provoking more and more reactions of anxiety and deformations of behaviour. In Nigeria he received texts of the famous, secret Ifa-oracle. Later he worked for more than six years as all-round-doctor in Niger, Congo-Brazzaville and Chad, where he continued his research on African psychology.

On 21 April 1974, he and two other Europeans were taken hostage by Hissène Habré, the later leader of Chad from 1982 until 1990. The other captives were two French citizens, Françoise Claustre, an archeologist, and Marc Combe, a development worker. Marc Combe escaped in 1975 but, despite the intervention of the French Government, Madame Claustre (whose husband was a senior French government official) was not released until 1 February 1977. Staewen (whose wife Elfriede was killed in the attack of capture) on the other hand was released after payments of West German officials on 11 June 1974.

References

German psychiatrists
1974 in Chad
1926 births
2002 deaths
German expatriates in Nigeria
German expatriates in Niger
German expatriates in the Republic of the Congo
German expatriates in Chad